FC Ekibastuz is a Kazakhstani football club based in Ekibastuz. Until 2008, the team represented Pavlodar and was called Energetik Pavlodar. In 2008, the team played as Energetik-2 Ekibastuz. In 2009, it was renamed to Ekibastuz FK. They are current members of the Kazakhstan First Division.

History

Names
2003 : Founded as Energetik
2008 : Renamed Energetik-2
2009 : Renamed Ekibastuz

Domestic history

Current squad 

(captain)

References

Ekibastuz, FC
2003 establishments in Kazakhstan